Visual comfort probability (VCP), also known as Guth Visual Comfort Probability, is a metric used to rate lighting scenes. 

VCP is defined as the percentage of people that will find a certain scene (viewpoint and direction) comfortable with regard to visual glare.
 
It was defined by Sylvester K. Guth in 1963.

References

Lighting
Architectural lighting design
Vision